The 2017 Italian GT Championship was the 26th season of the Italian GT Championship, the grand tourer-style sports car racing founded by the Italian automobile club (ACI). The Champsionship consisted of seven Sprint race events. At each event there were held two races. The Season started on 29 April in Imola and ended on 8 October in Mugello.

Calendar
All races were held in Italy.

Teams and Drivers

Super GT3

GT3

Super GT Cup

GT Cup

GT4

References

Italian Motorsports Championships
2017 in Italian motorsport